The Israel Campus Roundtable is an umbrella organization of pro-Israel groups in the New England area.

According to the Israel Campus Roundtable website, The Israel Campus Roundtable is a coalition of 19 organizations that provides students with resources and support for pro-Israel programming on campuses throughout New England.

Activities
According to Combined Jewish Philanthropies, the Campus Roundtable focuses on

 Promoting Israeli culture
 Promoting study abroad programs to Israel
 Creating educational programs about Israel
 Student-led Israel advocacy on campus

Member Organizations
 American Jewish Committee
 American Israel Public Affairs Committee (AIPAC)
 Anti-Defamation League (ADL)
 Combined Jewish Philanthropies (CJP)
 Committee for Accuracy in Middle East Reporting in America (CAMERA) 
 Consulate General of Israel to New England
 The David Project Center for Jewish Leadership
 Hasbara Fellowships 
 Hillel Council of New England
 Israeli American Council
 Israel on Campus Coalition
 Jewish Community Relations Council (JCRC)
 Jewish National Fund
 J Street U
 StandWithUs Los Angeles-based pro-Israel organization.
 Taglit Birthright Israel NEXT: Boston
 Young Judea
 Zionist Organization of America (ZOA)

External links
 Israel Campus Roundtable Official website hosted by the Combined Jewish Philanthropies, a United Way beneficiary.

References

Zionist youth movements
Zionist organizations
Israel–United States relations
Youth organizations based in the United States
Pro-Israel political advocacy groups in the United States